Maria Aracely Leiva Peña (born 23 June 1967) is a Honduran politician. She currently serves as deputy of the National Congress of Honduras representing the Liberal Party of Honduras for Atlántida.

References

1967 births
Living people
Deputies of the National Congress of Honduras
Liberal Party of Honduras politicians
People from Atlántida Department
21st-century Honduran women politicians
21st-century Honduran politicians